Charles Lyon, 6th Earl of Strathmore and Kinghorne (c. 1699 – 11 May 1728) was a Scottish peer and nobleman. He was the son of John Lyon, 4th Earl of Strathmore and Kinghorne. His exact date of birth is unknown but he was baptised on 12 July 1699.

Although his brother John Lyon, 5th Earl of Strathmore and Kinghorne was to display the family's royalist sympathies when he joined the Jacobite cause, and was slain at the battle of Sheriffmuir in 1715, Charles, the 6th Earl was not directly implicated in the rebellion and although both his family seats were visited by the Old Pretender (James). On 25 July 1725 he married Lady Susan Cochrane (died 23 June 1754), daughter of John Cochrane, 4th Earl of Dundonald. Earl Charles was killed in a brawl at Forfar by Carnegie of Finhaven in May 1728 and left no heir.

The death of the Earl

On 9 May 1728 Mr Carnegie of Lour, residing in the burgh of Forfar, was burying his daughter. Before the funeral, he entertained the Earl of Strathmore, his own brother James Carnegie of Finhaven, Mr Lyon of Bridgeton, and some others, at dinner in his house. After the funeral, these gentlemen adjourned to a tavern, and drank a good deal. Carnegie of Finhaven got extremely drunk. Lyon of Bridgeton was not so intoxicated, but the drink made him "rude and unmannerly" towards Finhaven.

Afterwards, the Earl of Strathmore went to call at the house of Mr Carnegie's sister, Lady Auchterhouse, and the others followed. The presence of a lady (even a lady who was a widowed sister-in-law) failed to make Bridgeton conduct himself discreetly. He continued his "boisterous rudeness" towards Finhaven and even used some rudeness towards the lady herself.

About dusk, the party sallied forth into the street, and here Bridgeton pushed Carnegie of Finhaven into a "deep and dirty kennel" (ditch), which covered him nearly head to foot with "mire". Incensed by Bridgeton's action, Carnegie of Finhaven rose and, drawing his sword, ran up to Bridgeton with "deadly design". The earl, seeing him advance, pushed Bridgeton aside, and unhappily received the lunge full in the middle of his own body. The Earl died forty-nine hours after the incident.

Carnegie of Finhaven was tried for murder in a famous trial which established the "not guilty" verdict (in addition to "proven" and "not proven") in Scots Law and the right of Scots juries to try the whole case and not just the facts known as Jury Nullification.

Ancestry

References

6
1699 births
1728 deaths
Charles